The 1976 NCAA Division I Golf Championship was the 38th annual NCAA-sanctioned golf tournament to determine the individual and team national champions of men's collegiate golf at the University Division level in the United States.

The tournament was held at the University of New Mexico Golf Course in Albuquerque, New Mexico.

Oklahoma State won the team championship, the Cowboys' first NCAA title.

Future U.S. Open champion Scott Simpson, from USC, won the individual title.

Individual results

Individual champion
 Scott Simpson, USC

Team results

DC = Defending champions
Debut appearance

References

NCAA Men's Golf Championship
Golf in New Mexico
NCAA Golf Championship
NCAA Golf Championship